This is a list of notable Lumbee people, including members of the Lumbee Tribe of North Carolina.

List
 Dean Chavers, Ph.D., Director of Catching the Dream, formerly called the Native American Scholarship Fund.
 Ben Chavis, Ph.D., author, and advocate of high-quality urban education. From 2000, he was an early leader of Oakland's American Indian Public Charter School. It won a National Blue Ribbon Award in 2007. He was indicted in March 2017 on six felony counts for money laundering and mail fraud, in association with certain activities at the school. 
 Chris Chavis, professional wrestler.
 Anybody Killa (aka ABK), hip hop artist from Detroit, MI signed to Psycopathic Records whose parents are Lumbee from North Carolina 
 Kenwin Cummings, NFL player (linebacker); attended Wingate University.
 Charles Graham, member of the North Carolina General Assembly.
 Johnny Hunt, Southern Baptist clergyman, senior pastor, former national president of the Southern Baptist Convention.
 Ashton Locklear, elite artistic gymnast, 2014 world champion with the United States team, 2016 Olympic Team Alternate and 2017 World Championship team member
 Gene Locklear, Major League Baseball player with the Cincinnati Reds, San Diego Padres and two other teams.
 Heather Locklear, American actress.
 Julian Pierce, lawyer. In 1988, Pierce ran for a newly created Superior Court Judgeship in Robeson County but was shot and killed at home. Ballot counts gave the victory to Pierce.  He would have been the first Native American to hold the position of Superior Court Judge in the state. 
 Jana Mashonee (born Jana Sampson), two-time Grammy-nominated singer. She has won 10 Nammy Awards.
 Kelvin Sampson, collegiate and professional basketball coach, currently the Head Coach of the Houston Cougars.
 Helen Maynor Scheirbeck, appointed by Congress to the National Museum of the American Indian (NMAI) Board of Directors, and continues to serve as NMAI's Assistant Director of Public Programs.
 Ruth Dial Woods, educator, community worker and activist.

References

 
Lumbee
Lumbee
Native American leaders
People of Lumbee descent
Lumbee